Bryan Edward Hill is an American author, screenwriter, musician, comic book writer, and graphic designer.

Early life and education
Hill was born in Chicago and moved to St. Louis, Missouri as a child, where he attended the prep academy John Burroughs School.

Career
Hill was hired by Top Cow Productions to expand the Witchblade universe by writing the trade paperback Broken Trinity:Pandora's Box with former Top Cow Productions editor Rob Levin. Hill later wrote the book 7 Days from Hell for Top Cow Productions, and was later hired to adapt it into a screenplay.  He also co-wrote Netherworld, a comic book, for Heroes and Villains. He co-wrote the comic book Postal with Matt Hawkins, which began publication in 2015. He began writing it by himself at issue #12.

In 2013, Hill began work on several feature screenplays, including the action-thriller Gone, sold to Universal Studios.  He wrote the screen adaptation of the video game series Just Cause 2 (Square Enix). He has since worked on series such as Ash vs Evil Dead and Titans.

Hill has acted as a consultant on popular culture, narrative communication, and media consumption to PepsiCo, JP Morgan Chase, M&M Mars, Unilever, and Chiat/Day.  Hill has written articles for the Thinktopia: NewIdeas Blog.

On June 27, 2018, Hill took over as writer for Detective Comics, for the DC character Batman, for a five issue arc titled On the Outside. This arc set up for a new volume of Batman and the Outsiders written by Hill, to be released in December 2018, starring Batman, Katana, Black Lightning, Cassandra Cain, and Duke Thomas.

References

External links
 

Year of birth missing (living people)
21st-century American male writers
21st-century American screenwriters
Living people
African-American comics creators
American consultants
American graphic designers
American graphic novelists
American male musicians
American male screenwriters
American male writers
American television writers